The Rural City of Bellarine was a local government area southeast of the regional city of Geelong, Victoria, Australia, covering most of the Bellarine Peninsula.

History

Bellarine was first incorporated as the Portarlington Road District on 12 December 1853, and became a shire on 26 September 1865. On 12 December 1989, Bellarine was proclaimed a rural city.

On 18 May 1993, the Rural City of Bellarine was abolished, and along with the Cities of Geelong, Geelong West and Newtown, the Shire of Corio and parts of the City of South Barwon and the Shires of Barrabool and Bannockburn, was merged into the newly created City of Greater Geelong.

Wards

The Rural City of Bellarine was divided into three ridings, each of which elected three councillors:
 Bellarine Riding
 Paywit Riding
 Moolap Riding

Towns and localities
 Bellarine
 Clifton Springs
 Curlewis
 Drysdale* (including the neighbourhood of Murradoc)
 Indented Head
 Leopold
 Mannerim
 Marcus Hill
 Moolap (including the neighbourhood of Point Henry)
 Newcomb
 Ocean Grove
 Point Lonsdale (shared with the Borough of Queenscliffe)
 Portarlington
 St Leonards
 Swan Bay
 Wallington (including the neighbourhood of Fenwick)
 Whittington

* Council seat.

Population

* Estimate in 1958 Victorian Year Book.

References

External links
 Victorian Places - Bellarine Rural City

Bellarine
Bellarine Peninsula
City of Greater Geelong
1853 establishments in Australia
1993 disestablishments in Australia